George Craig Laurence (21 January 1905 – 6 November 1987) was a Canadian nuclear physicist. He was educated at Dalhousie University, and at Cambridge University under Ernest Rutherford.

He was appointed as Radium and X-ray physicist to the Canadian National Research Council in 1930. In 1939-40 he attempted to build a graphite-uranium reactor in Ottawa, anticipating Enrico Fermi's work by several months. In 1942 he joined the Anglo-French nuclear research team at the Montreal Laboratory, where he was responsible for recruiting Canadian scientists. The laboratory later transferred to the Chalk River, and built the ZEEP Reactor, the first outside the U.S.A.

In 1946-47 he was in the Canadian delegation to the United Nations Atomic Energy Commission. He then returned to Montreal Laboratory and continued to carry out his research from 1950 to 1961. He was then at the Chalk River Laboratory, and was President of the Atomic Energy Control Board from 1961 to 1970.

Laurence Court, a street in Deep River, Ontario, is named in his honour.

Publication
Early Years of Nuclear Energy Research in Canada  by George C. Laurence

Archives
There is a George Laurence fonds at Library and Archives Canada. Archival reference number is R15952.

References

Further reading
The Canadian Encyclopedia Volume II (1988, 2nd Edition, Hurtig, Edmonton)

1905 births
1987 deaths
Dalhousie University alumni
Canadian physicists
Canadian nuclear physicists
Manhattan Project people
People from Charlottetown
Presidents of the Canadian Association of Physicists